Rabbit Richards is a New York-born performance poet who has been based out of Montreal for several years. Their stories and poetry blend the politics of race, love and gender with the emotional grounding of lived experience. They are a member of the Kalmunity Vibe Collective and a practiced improvisational artist. Richards is also the two time captain of Montreal's Throw Poetry Collective.

Richards is non-binary and previously identified as female. In 2015 they were recognized as the first woman to ever win the Underground Indies poetry slam at the Canadian Festival of Spoken Word.

References

Slam poets
American performance artists
Writers from New York City
Year of birth missing (living people)
Living people
African-American poets
Non-binary writers
American expatriates in Canada
21st-century African-American people